Thomas Qvist Bucher-Johannessen (born 3 February 1997) is a Norwegian cross-country skier.

At the 2016 Junior World Championships he finished sixth in the 10 kilometres, followed by a ninth place in 2017 and a sixth place as best at the 2019 Junior World Championships. He made his World Cup debut in March 2019 at the Holmenkollen ski festival, where he also collected his first World Cup points with a 13th-place finish at the Holmenkollen 50 km.

He represents the sports club Fossum IF and Team AF Håndverk.

Cross-country skiing results
All results are sourced from the International Ski Federation (FIS).

World Cup

Season standings

References 

1997 births
Living people
Sportspeople from Bærum
Norwegian male cross-country skiers
Place of birth missing (living people)